A list of notable Polish politicians and members of the defunct Centre Agreement party.

A
 Andrzej Adamczyk
 Waldemar Andzel

B
 Bogusław Bosak
 Joachim Brudziński
 Mariusz Błaszczak

C
 Tadeusz Cymański
 Krzysztof Czarnecki
 Witold Czarnecki

D
 Andrzej Diakonow
 Ludwik Dorn

G
 Szymon Giżyński
 Adam Glapiński
 Małgorzata Gosiewska
 Przemysław Gosiewski
 Andrzej Maria Gołaś

H
 Zbigniew Hoffmann

J
 Krzysztof Jurgiel

K
 Jarosław Kaczyński
 Lech Kaczyński
 Karol Karski
 Leonard Krasulski
 Marek Kuchciński
 Jacek Kurski
 Krzysztof Kwiatkowski

L
 Adam Lipiński
 Andrzej Liss

M
 Ewa Malik
 Mirosława Masłowska
 Jerzy Materna

N
 Aleksandra Natalli-Świat
 Ryszard Nowak

O
 Jan Olszewski

P
 Jan Parys
 Krzysztof Piesiewicz
 Julia Pitera
 Marcin Przybyłowicz
 Krzysztof Putra

S
 Andrzej Smirnow
 Marek Suski
 Jolanta Szczypińska
 Bartłomiej Szrajber
 Jan Szyszko

T
 Krzysztof Tchórzewski

W
 Waldemar Wiązowski
 Wojciech Włodarczyk

Z
 Jarosław Zieliński
 Kosma Złotowski